Sennoy is an urban locality (an urban-type settlement) in Volsky District of Saratov Oblast, Russia. Population:

References

Urban-type settlements in Saratov Oblast